The 1958 NCAA Skiing Championships were contested at the Dartmouth Skiway in Lyme, New Hampshire at the fifth annual NCAA-sanctioned ski tournament to determine the individual and team national champions of men's collegiate alpine skiing, cross-country skiing, and ski jumping in the United States.

Host Dartmouth, coached by Al Merrill, edged four-time defending champion Denver in the team standings to claim their first national championship.

For the first time in its brief history, there were no repeat individual NCAA champions.

Venue

This year's championships were held February 28 to March 2 in New Hampshire at the Dartmouth Skiway in Lyme, hosted by nearby Dartmouth College.

The championships returned to Dartmouth Skiway in 1964, but rain forced the transfer of the alpine events to Cannon Mountain; the next time at Dartmouth was in 2003.

Team scoring

Individual events

Four events were held, which yielded seven individual titles.

See also
List of NCAA skiing programs

References

NCAA Skiing Championships
NCAA Skiing Championships
NCAA Skiing Championships
NCAA Skiing Championships
NCAA Skiing Championships
NCAA Skiing Championships
NCAA Skiing Championships
NCAA Skiing Championships
Skiing in New Hampshire